Lip Sync Battle Philippines is a Philippine musical-reality competition television series broadcast by GMA Network. Hosted by Michael V. and Iya Villania, the show premiered on February 27, 2016 succeeding Celebrity Bluff. It is the Philippine version of the American reality television series under the same title. The show concluded on August 27, 2016 with a total of 26 episodes. It was replaced by Superstar Duets on its timeslot. The show returned for a third season on April 1, 2018 on the network's Sunday Grande sa Gabi line up replacing All Star Videoke.

Series overview

Season 1 (2016)

Season 2 (2016)
Note: Winners are listed in bold.

Season 3 (2018)
Note: Winners are listed in bold.

Additional notes
 Abrenica and his special guest, Versoza, the casts of Sandugo,  both played the role of Machete in two different generations. This makes Versoza's appearance notable.
 Guevarra and Nacua are the first tag team winner to have the Lip Sync Battle Championship Belt.
 The second song of Napoles, "Let's Get Loud" is a reference to Lola Tinidora's special song in Eat Bulaga!'s Kalyeserye where Richards is a main cast.
 The episode's special guests, del Moral and Pangilinan, are both co-stars of the contestants. del Moral is in Because of You with Ching and Martin while Pangilinan is with Umali and Tanfelix in Wish I May.
 The second song of de Castro, "Fantastic Baby" is a reference to Yaya Dub's special song in Eat Bulaga's Kalyeserye.
 Cruz and Paner, of the 80's all-girl group "The Triplets", joined de Leon's round 2 performance against Reynes, their third member of the group. Meanwhile, Chan, Reynes' co-star in the afternoon series Destiny Rose joined her as Destiny Rose himself.
 Regino is the original singer of the song lip synced by Martin for her second performance.
 The first three-way battle participates. The theme for this week's challenge was to lip sync the songs of Madonna.

References

Lists of reality television series episodes
Lists of Philippine television series episodes